Losaria neptunus, the yellow-bodied club-tail or yellow club-tail, is a species of butterfly from the family Papilionidae that is found in Sumatra, south Burma, north Borneo and the Philippines

The wings are dark brown or black. The lower half of the abdomen is yellow. It has white markings on the forewings and a red patch on each hindwing.

The larvae feed on Thottea and Aristolochia species.

Subspecies
L. n. neptunus (southern Burma to Peninsular Malaya, Langkawi)
L. n. fehri (Honrath, 1892) (Nias)
L. n. sumatra Hagen (northern Sumatra)
L. n. padanganus Rothschild (western and southern Sumatra)
L. n. doris Rothschild (northern Borneo) 
L. n. dacasini (Schröder, 1976) (Philippines: Palawan)
L. n. matbai Schröder & Treadaway, 1990 (Philippines: Tawitawi)

References

Butterflies described in 1840
Losaria
Butterflies of Borneo